Ferrara is an Italian surname. Notable people with the surname include:

 Abel Ferrara (born 1951), American film director
 Adam Ferrara (born 1966), American actor and comedian
 Al Ferrara (born 1939), American baseball player
 Alessandro Ferrara (born 1953), Italian philosopher
 Antonella Ferrara (born 1963), Italian control theorist and engineer
 Christopher Ferrara (born 1952) American attorney, anti-abortion activist, and journalist
 Ciro Ferrara (born 1967), Italian football player
 Donna Ferrara (born 1959), New York politician
 Ed Ferrara (born 1966), American wrestling booker
 Eric Ferrara (born 1970), American author, researcher, movie & television consultant
 Franco Ferrara (1911–1985), Italian conductor
 Jackie Ferrara (born 1929), American sculptor
 Jean-Jacques Ferrara (born 1967), French politician
 Jerry Ferrara (born 1979), American actor
 Jon V. Ferrara (born 1960), American entrepreneur
 Juan Ferrara (born 1943) Mexican telenovela and film actor
 Katherine Ferrara, American engineer
 Manuel Ferrara (born 1975), French-Spanish pornographic actor
 Mike Ferrara (born 1958), American basketball player
 Napoleone Ferrara (born 1956), Italian-American molecular biologist
 Nicola Ferrara (born 1910), Argentine football player
 Paul Ferrara (born 1939), American photographer
 Paul B. Ferrara (1942–2011), American DNA scientist
 Peter Ferrara (born 1955), American lawyer and activist
 Rosina Ferrara (1861–1934), model to 19th-century American and British painters, muse of John Singer Sargent
 Theresa Ferrara (1951–1979), Italian-American criminal, associate to the Lucchese-Family
 Stéphane Ferrara (born 1956), French boxer and actor
 Tony Ferrara (1927–2009, American baseball player, coach, and scout
 Vincent M. Ferrara (born 1949) Italian-American mobster

See also 
 Riccobaldo of Ferrara (1246 – after 1320), Italian notary and writer
 Giacomo Andrea da Ferrara (died 1500), architect active in Milan; the author on a commentary on Vitruvius
 
 Ferrara (disambiguation)
 Ferrari (surname)
 Ferraris (surname)
 Ferraro
 Ferrera
 Ferrero

References 

Surnames
Italian-language surnames
Surnames of Italian origin